29 Camelopardalis (29 Cam) is a double star in the circumpolar constellation Camelopardalis. With an apparent magnitude of 6.59, it's right below the max visibility to the naked eye, and can only be viewed under phenomenal conditions. The star is located 484 light years away based on parallax, but is drifting further away with a radial velocity of 3.9 km/s.

29 Cam A 
29 Cam A has a classification of A4IV-V, which suggests that this star is beginning to evolve off the main sequence. Zorec et al. models it as a star that has completed 90.6% of the main sequence, which correlates to an age of 380 million years. At present, 29 Cam has 2.47 the mass of the Sun, and 3.49 times its radius.  It radiates at 58.9 times the luminosity of the Sun from an effective temperature of 8,337 K, which gives it a white hue of an A-type star. 29 Cam spins rapidly at a projected rotational velocity of 123 km/s despite its evolved state.

29 Cam B 
29 Cam has a companion designated BD+56 1065B, which is a 10 magnitude star. According to the proper motion, this star is unrelated to the primary, and is 4 times farther than the primary. The companion is relatively cooler and less luminous than the primary.

References 

Camelopardalis (constellation)
A-type subgiants
Camelopardalis, 29
Durchmusterung objects
038618
027592
1992